Ian Stenton is a former professional rugby league footballer who played in the 1960s and 1970s.

Playing career

County honours
Ian Stenton won a cap for Yorkshire while at Castleford, he played right-, i.e. number 3, in the 34-8 victory over Lancashire at Wheldon Road, Castleford on 24 February 1971.

Challenge Cup Final appearances
Ian Stenton played left-, i.e. number 4, in Castleford's 7-2 victory over Wigan in the 1970 Challenge Cup Final during the 1969–70 season at Wembley Stadium, London on Saturday 9 May 1970, in front of a crowd of 95,255.

BBC2 Floodlit Trophy Final appearances
Ian Stenton played right-, i.e. number 3, in Castleford's 7-2 victory over Swinton in the 1966 BBC2 Floodlit Trophy Final during the 1966–67 season at Wheldon Road, Castleford on Tuesday 20 December 1966, played left-, i.e. number 4, in the 8-5 victory over Leigh in the 1967 BBC2 Floodlit Trophy Final during the 1967–68 season at Headingley Rugby Stadium, Leeds on Saturday 16 January 1968.

References

External links
Search for "Stenton" at rugbyleagueproject.org
Ian Stenton Memory Box Search at archive.castigersheritage.com

Living people
Castleford Tigers players
English rugby league players
Hull F.C. players
Place of birth missing (living people)
Rugby league centres
Year of birth missing (living people)
Yorkshire rugby league team players